Luisa Morgantini (born 5 November 1940 in Villadossola) is an Italian former Member of the European Parliament. She was elected as independent with the Communist Refoundation Party ticket and sat with the European United Left - Nordic Green Left group.

She is a leading member of the Italian peace movement and was one of the founders of the Italian branch of the Women in Black anti-war organisation.

Career
 1954 to 1958 she worked as clerical worker
 1958 to 1964 she worked as an INCA social worker.
 1964 to 1966 she was full time with the Italian Communist Party
 1958 to 1966 she lived in Bologna.
 1967 to 1968 she studied at Ruskin College, Oxford – industrial sociology and economics.
 1969 to 1970: she worked Adult education at the Humanitarian Society in Milano.
 1971 to 1974: Training officer for FLM trade union.
 1974 to 1985: first woman elected in a metalworkers union secretariatMilan FLM (FIOM-FIM-UILM) secretariat – press and telecommunications sector.
 1985 to 1999: International relations officer for FLM (FIOM-FIM-UILM)trade union.
 FEM European trade union executive committee (1987–1999).
 Electoral observer for the Organization for Security and Co-operation in Europe. Italy-Nicaragua coordinator Italian Association for friendship with Nicaragua (1979–1991).
 Since 1979 she was involved with many solidarity and NGOs projects concerning many countries, such as Nicaragua, Brazil, South Africa, Chile, Mozambique, Eritrea, Afghanistan, Palestine, Algeria, Peru, Argentina, Colombia, and Angola
 Since 1982 she has been dealing with Middle East issues and mainly the Israeli–Palestinian conflict.
 Since 1988 she has been cooperating for the reconstruction of network and links between Israeli and Palestinian Peace movements. She has supported especially women's associations in Israel and Palestine and in other Mediterranean countries (e.g., Yugoslavia, Albania, Algeria, Morocco, Tunisia) and Afghanistan and Kurdistan in Turkey.
 National spokesperson for the Italian Association for Peace (a non-violent movement for peace and social justice); from 1994 to 1999 responsible for the 'Palestine' group. One of the founders of the 'Women in Black' anti-war movement and the international network 'Women for peace in conflict zones'.

In 1995 she received the 'Women in Black' Peace Prize from the eponymous Israeli left-wing anti-war organisation.

On 4 October 2008 she has been awarded with the 2008 Peacemaker Award by the Rebuilding Alliance, a US-based non-profit organization, committed to the respect of human rights and international law and in rebuilding homes and communities in regions of war and occupation.
She was chosen as one of the 1000 international women for the Nobel Prize. For her work during the Italian earthquake in Irpinia on 1980 she was awarded the citizenship of Teora, the town where she stayed one year as volunteer. 
She also won the Colomba per la Pace price with the patronage of the President of the Italian republic.
From 1999 till 2009 she was a member of the European Parliament. She retired in 2009 because her commitment was to serve two terms, and she also cited age concerns.  
She continues her commitment to Palestine, migrants and the antiwar movement. She is the President of AssoPacePalestina a voluntary organization www.assopacepalestina.org

European Parliament
Luisa Morgantini was a Member of the European Parliament in the European United Left–Nordic Green Left – elected the first time in 1999 and again in 2004.

During the last term, she was chairman of the Delegation for relations with the Palestinian Legislative Council, member of the Committee on Development and Cooperation, of the Delegation for relations with the countries of South Asia and the South Asia Association for Regional Cooperation; substitute member of the Committee on Industry, Research and Energy, the Committee on International Trade and of the Committee on Women's Rights and Gender Equality.

From the period July 2004 to December 2006 she was Chair of the Committee on Development.

Currently (2007 - 2009) she is Vice President of the European Parliament, member of the Committee on Development, co-chair of the election coordination group, member of the Subcommittee on Human Rights, of the Delegation for relations with the Palestinian Legislative Council, of the Euro-Mediterranean Parliamentary Assembly, and substitute member of the Committee on Women's Rights and Gender Equality, of the Committee on Constitutional Affairs and of the Delegation to the ACP-EU Joint Parliamentary Assembly.

As a Member of the European Parliament she keeps on working for the solution of the Middle East conflict, for a just peace, for the right of the two peoples to live in peace and safety, within recognized borders. As part of this activism, she was nominated for the 2005 Nobel Peace Prize, as part of the project "1,000 peace women for Nobel prize for peace 2005."

In June 2008 she participated in an illegal demonstration in a military exclusion zone near Bil'in. Morgantini inhaled tear gas durirng the demonstration dispersal.

On 4 October 2008 she was awarded the 2008 Peacemaker Award by the Rebuilding Alliance, a US non-profit organization committed for the respect of human rights and international law and in rebuilding homes and communities in regions of war and occupation.

Bibliography
 Oltre la danza macabra. No alla guerra, no al terrorismo, Nutrimenti, Roma, 2004. 
 Nawal al-Sa‘dawi, L'amore ai tempi del petrolio, translated by Marika Macco, introduction by Luisa Morgantini, il Sirente, Fagnano Alto, 2009.

References

External links
 https://web.archive.org/web/20070210154719/http://www.luisamorgantini.net/
 Luisa Morgantini's Profile at the European Parliament

1940 births
Living people
Italian anti-war activists
Communist Refoundation Party MEPs
Communist Refoundation Party politicians
Italian socialist feminists
MEPs for Italy 2004–2009
MEPs for Italy 1999–2004